Araya may refer to:

 Araya (name), a surname and given name (including a list of persons with the name)
 Araya (film), a 1959 documentary film
 Arya metre, a poetic meter used in Prakrit and Sanskrit poetry

Places
Araya, Venezuela, a town in Venezuela
 Araya Fortress, former Spanish fortress in Araya, Venezuela
 Araya Peninsula, a peninsula of Venezuela, on the Caribbean Sea
 Araya, Lebanon, a village southeast of Beirut, Lebanon, twinned with Cholet, France
 Araya, Spain, a town in Álava, Basque Country, Spain
 Araya Station (Gunma), railway station in Gunma, Japan
 Araya Station (Akita), railway station in Akita, Japan

Other uses 
Araya (video game), a 2016 horror video game

See also
Araia (disambiguation)